Nuri is a city in Sudan.

Nuri or Nüri may also refer to:

Places 
 Nuri, East Azerbaijan, Iran
 Nuri, Razavi Khorasan, Iran
 Kalateh-ye Nuri (disambiguation), several places in Iran
 Nüri, a village in northeastern Estonia

Other uses 
 Nuri (name)
 Nuri (rocket), a South Korean carrier rocket
 Great Mosque of al-Nuri (disambiguation) or Nuri Mosque
 Typhoon Nuri, name of three tropical cyclones in the Western Pacific Ocean
 Nuri (company), a German bitcoin banking service formerly known as Bitwala